Malanów may refer to the following places:
Malanów, Greater Poland Voivodeship (west-central Poland)
Malanów, Pabianice County in Łódź Voivodeship (central Poland)
Malanów, Wieruszów County in Łódź Voivodeship (central Poland)